The West Siberian rebellion was the largest of the Russian peasant uprisings against the nascent Bolshevik state. It began in early 1921 and was defeated at the end of 1922, due in part to the brutal repression of the militarily superior Red Army, and the famine that the region suffered.

Background 
At the beginning of the 20th century, the Russian peasantry experienced two wars against the Russian state, both the product of revolutions and both ended with the imposition of state power: 1905–1907 and 1917–1922.

Rebellions in Central and Eastern Siberia against whites 
The rebellious peasants were always enemies of the whites. The latter refused to accept land tenure reform and wanted revenge on the villagers for expropriating the land themselves in 1917. Admiral Aleksandr Kolchak made the fatal mistake of winning the animosity of peasants, by restoring the rights of landowners. Many Siberian villagers were descendants of Russian and Ukrainian immigrants who had fled from serfdom and had a strong love for their freedom.

The guerrillas began shortly after the formation of their government, on August 31, 1918, in the rural areas near Slavgorod, Altai. But the problem worsened in early 1919. The White Army began to carry out grain requisitions and a military draft, but most of their recruits deserted and numerous rear-guard revolts broke out (encouraged by Bolshevik activists, anarchists and left-wing SRs). Taiga guerrillas were often led by deserters and sometimes joined scattered Red soldiers when the whites conquered the region in 1918, setting out to ambush units and cut off supply lines. Kolchak resorted to terror to placate them.

With its rear weakened by the wear and tear of the guerrillas and being forced to distract its detachments in defending themselves against the peasantry, the white regime could not stop the advance of 200,000 Bolsheviks, who, on the other hand, knew how to add local partisans to their forces wherever they advanced. At the end of 1919, when the Siberian regime was totally defeated and disintegrated, the autonomous bands from Central Siberia to Amur Oblast numbered more than 100,000 combatants.

Fall of Kolchak and Bolshevik advance 
When his forces withdrew in 1920, Kolchak faced numerous mutinies that joined the guerrillas, leaving his loyal few completely alone and condemned. The Eastern Front of the Red Army, under the command of Major General Vladimir Olderogge and formed by 70,000 soldiers, seized Tyumen and Kurgan and then attacked Petropavlovsk on August 25. In response, 58,000 targets commanded by General Mikhail Diterikhs fought back, seizing Tobolsk and driving the Bolsheviks across the Tobol River. On October 14 with 75,000 soldiers, Olderogge ordered a new offensive, forcing the 56,000 whites to withdraw from Petropavlovsk on October 29. Diterikhs suffered 5,000 dead and 8,000 prisoners. After the defeat, the Bolshevik advance became unstoppable, as did the peasant guerrillas. Nearly 100,000 whites were killed, captured or deserted in the following months. Omsk, Novosibirsk, Tomsk, Krasnoyarsk and Irkutsk all fell into their hands. In early February 1920, after the Great Siberian Ice March 25,000 surviving white soldiers entered Irkutsk and soon fled to Chita. The withdrawal of the Japanese from Chitá, on October 21, 1920, and the consolidation of the Republic of the Far East made the guerrillas disappear from the region.

Between the late 1920s and early 1921, with the foreseeable defeat of the White Movement, the Red Army was in charge of subduing the unruly rural world. The latter was disunited in various movements led by its own atamans.

Rebellion 
On January 31, 1921, a small revolt broke out in the village of Chelnokovskom, in the Ishim province, which soon spread to the neighboring regions of Tyumen, Akmola , Omsk, Chelyabinsk, Tobolsk, Tomsk and Yekaterinburg, causing the Bolsheviks to lose control of Western Siberia, from Kurgan to Irkutsk. It was the largest green uprising, both by the number of rebels and their geographic extension, and perhaps the least studied. They dominated a population of three million four hundred thousand people. Its causes were the aggressive searches carried out by the 35,000 soldiers of the "prodotriady" installed in Siberia after the defeat of Kolchak and the violation of peasant democracy, since the Bolsheviks falsified the elections in the regional volost. The main leaders of these bands were Semyon Serkov, Václav Puzhevsky, Vasily Zheltovsky, Timoféi Sitnikov, Stepan Danilov, Vladimir Rodin, Piotr Dolin, Grégory Atamanov, Afanasi Afanasiev and Petr Shevchenko. In charge of the Red revolutionary military council of the region was Ivan Smirnov, Vasili Shorin, Checkist Ivan Pavlunovsky and Makar Vasiliev.

Although sources vary the total number of peasants in arms from 30,000 to 150,000. Historian Vladimir Shulpyakov gives the figure of 70,000 or 100,000 men, but the most likely figure is 55,000 to 60,000 rebels. Many Cossacks from the region joined. They controlled a total of twelve districts and occupied the cities of Ishim, Beryozovo, Obdorsk, Barabinsk, Kainsk, Tobolsk and Petropavlovsk, and seized the Trans-Siberian railway between February and March 1921.

The desperate courage of these rebels led to a terrible campaign of repression by the Cheka. The President of the Party in Siberia, Ivan Smirnov, estimated that up to March 12, 1921, 7,000 peasants had been murdered in the Petropavl region alone and another 15,000 in Ishim. In the town of Aromashevo, between April 28 and May 1, the Red troops faced 10,000 peasants; 700 Greens died in combat, many drowned in rivers when they fled, and 5,700 were captured with many weapons and loot. For another two days the greens were endlessly hunted. The victory allowed the Reds to regain control of the north of Ishim. Indeed, with these actions, together with the establishment of permanent garrisons, revolutionary committees and an espionage network, the capture of several leaders - granting amnesties in exchange for handing over former comrades, mass executions, taking hostages of family members, and artillery bombardments of entire villages, the major operations ended and the rebels turned to guerrilla warfare. In December 1922 reports stated that "banditry" had all but disappeared.

End 
The abandonment of the Prodrazvyorstka and the adoption of the New Economic Policy (NEP) was key to its submission. The last insurgent foci were crushed at the end of 1922 in Ishim, after a ferocious repression and a devastating famine that wiped out the farmers. New anti-communist guerrillas would only emerge with the invasion of Nazi Germany.

See also 
 Russian Civil War
 Green armies
 Tambov Rebellion
 Makhnovist Revolution
 Pitchfork uprising
 Kazym rebellion

References

Notes

Bibliography 

 

 

 

Peasant revolts
Russian Civil War
History of Siberia
Anti-Bolshevik uprisings
Rebellions in Russia
20th-century rebellions
Conflicts in 1921
Conflicts in 1922